Teltscher is a surname of German origin and means inhibitant of Teltsch (town in the Czech Republic). People with that name include:

 Eliot Teltscher (born 1959), retired professional American tennis player
 Josef Eduard Teltscher (born 1801), Austrian painter and lithographer
 Mark Teltscher (active from 2005), English poker player

See also
 

Surnames of German origin